River of the dead may indicate:
Imjin River, nicknamed river of the dead because large numbers of dead North Koreans have floated down it
a location in The Legend of Zelda: Breath of the Wild
River of the Dead (Barbara Nadel), a novel by Barbara Nadel
River of the Dead: Crime Thriller, a novel by Robert Pobi
Sai no Kawara, "river of the dead", children's Limbo, in Japanese folklore

See also
Dead River (disambiguation)